Divya Dwivedi is a philosopher and author based in India. She is an associate professor at the Indian Institute of Technology, Delhi. Her work focuses on ontology, metaphysics, literature, and philosophy of politics.

Early life and education 
Dwivedi is originally from Allahabad.  Her mother is Sunitha Dwivedi and her father, Rakesh Dwivedi, practices as a senior lawyer for the Supreme Court of India. Dwivedi’s grandfather (paternal), S. N. Dwivedi was a judge at the Supreme Court of India, and her grandfather (maternal) Raj Mangal Pandewas a minister in the union government of India.

She received her Bachelor of Arts degree from Lady Shri Ram College, Delhi and her Master's degree from St. Stephen's College. She pursued her M.Phil from University of Delhi and received her doctorate from Indian Institute of Technology, Delhi.

Career 
Dwivedi is currently an associate professor at Department of Humanities & Social Sciences, IIT Delhi. She had earlier taught at St. Stephen's College and at Dept. of English, Delhi University. She was a visiting scholar at Centre for Fictionality Studies, Aarhus University in 2013 and 2014.

Dwivedi's political writings have been critical of caste oppression, religious discrimination, Hindu nationalism.

She is the editor and co-founder of the international multilingual journal Philosophy World Democracy with Zeynep Direk, Achille Mbembe, Jean-Luc Nancy, Shaj Mohan, and Mireille Delmas-Marty.

American journal for critical theory, Episteme, published a special issue on the work of Dwivedi and Shaj Mohan in 2021.

She is a member of the Theory Committee of the International Comparative Literature Association along with Robert J. C. Young, Stefan Willer and others. Dwivedi is a member of the International Network of Women Philosophers.

Philosophical works and views
Dwivedi's philosophical standpoint departs from the school of deconstruction and it was described as deconstructive materialism.  Her philosophical research projects developed in a "community of friendship with Jean-Luc Nancy, Bernard Stiegler, Achille Mbembe, and Barbara Cassin". She publishes in the areas of ontology, narratology, metaphysics, linguistics, and deconstruction.

Dwivedi’s work on Psychoanalysis is focused on the theory of drives in Sigmund Freud. Jean-Luc Nancy said that her work on Freud is "very enlightening" and she has "tied up a very important link between the texts of Freud", thereby showing the connections between Freud’s theory of drives, mass psychology and politics.

School of thought 
Dwivedi said that philosophy is a disruptive practice following from the Socratic model. Following from it there is "a necessary relation between philosophy and politics". She is opposed to treating philosophical traditions as adjectives of philosophical practice.

In an introduction to the December 2017 Women Philosphers' Journal guest-edited by Dwivedi, Barbara Cassin wrote Dwivedi "is a philosopher" whose refusal to make "the post-colonial the first and the last word undoubtedly allows us to clarify with greater precision what is happening to women, philosophers and intellectuals in India today".

In an interview with Mediapart Dwivedi said that postcolonial theory and Hindu nationalism are two versions of the same theory, and that they are both upper caste political projects. Dwivedi noted that in the field of feminism postcolonial theory remains an upper caste theoretical standpoint which has been preventing lower caste feminists from opening their own currents in the context of the Me too movement. Dwivedi wrote in her editorial introduction to the UNESCO journal La Revue des Femmes-Philosophes that postcolonial theory is continuous with Hindu nationalism.

Gandhi and Philosophy: On Theological Anti-politics 
In 2018, Dwivedi co-authored Gandhi and Philosophy: On Theological Anti-politics with the philosopher Shaj Mohan. The book examines different aspects of Mahatma Gandhi's thought from a new philosophical system based on the concept of anastasis.  Jean-Luc Nancy wrote the foreword to Gandhi and Philosophy and said that it gives a new orientation to philosophy which is neither metaphysics nor hypophysics.

The book proposes that in addition to the metaphysical tendency in philosophy there is a 'hypophysical tendency'; hypophysics is defined as "a conception of nature as value". As per hypophysics the distance from nature that human beings and natural objects come to have through the effects of technology lessens their value, or brings them closer to evil. Gandhi's concept of passive force or nonviolence is an implication of his hypophysical commitment to nature. Dwivedi made a separation between metaphysics and hypophysics in her Royal Institute of Philosophy lecture, "While both seek to diagnose the 'west', each opens on to distinct futures: metaphysics to an "other thinking" than philosophy, hypophysics to the other of thinking itself".

Gandhi and Philosophy identifies racism with caste practices and controversially ascribes a form of racism to Gandhi. When The Indian Express reported on the developing uproar resulting from allegations of Gandhi's racism, Dwivedi said in response that Gandhi was a specific type of racist "invented a new basis for racism, which is based on moral superiority".

Scholarship and public interventions on caste 
Dwivedi is noted for writing against caste oppression and arguing that Hinduism was constructed in the early 20th century by the upper caste leaders of India such as Mahatma Gandhi to hide caste discrimination. As quoted by The Print, "The Hindu religion was invented in the early 20th century in order to hide the fact that the lower caste people are the real majority of India…" In an interview to LARB  she said that "Hindu" as a word is not of Indian origin. The British colonial census revealed that the lower caste people of India are the majority of India and the upper castes constructed the Hindu category in collaboration with the colonial administration. She wrote in the journal ESPRIT that caste oppression is masked through the Hindu category. In the 2021 January cover story of the Caravan magazine titled "The Hindu Hoax: How Upper Castes Invented a Hindu Majority" she argued that lower caste political leaders were opposed to the Hindu category when it was being proposed during the colonial rule. In the same article Dwivedi said that colonialism was mostly a liberating experience for the lower caste people, as it allowed them access to public spaces and public institutions such as schools and the army. After the publication of the Caravan article Dwivedi received threats against her as reported by news media including TruthOut and Le Monde. Jean-Luc Nancy wrote in the Liberation about Dwivedi’s writings on caste oppression and expressed concern about the threats to her. She opposed caste oppression in several interviews including to Le Monde and articles. 

Dwivedi has also supported individuals suffering under institutional caste oppression. Mathrubhumi and other media reported that Dwivedi "expressed her concerns over the ongoing protest against alleged caste discrimination at KR Narayanan National Institute of Visual Science and Arts (KRNNIVSA) in Kottayam". 

Dwivedi believes that the caste system is the dominant factor in the organization of Indian society and governance, and destruction of the caste order is the "only worthy pursuit of Indian politics." However, in her view, this goal cannot be achieved through routine transfer of political power but would instead require a French-style social revolution.

Reception 
The Book Review said that the philosophical project of Gandhi and Philosophy is to create new evaluative categories, "the authors, in engaging with Gandhi's thought, create their categories, at once descriptive and evaluative" while pointing to the difficulty given by the rigour of a "A seminal if difficult read for those with an appetite for philosophy".

Robert Bernasconi noted that Gandhi and Philosophy is "not a book that you will understand at first reading". The difficulty due to the constructivist style was noted by other authors as well. The Indian Express stated "Mohan and Dwivedi have done a masterful job of avoiding the binary fork — hagiography or vituperation — as much of Gandhi and hagiography comes from a need to spiritualise Gandhi".

Economic and Political Weekly pointed to Dwivedi's participation in the paradigm of "western philosophy", especially when Gandhi's goal was to create an alternative to Eurocentrism. EPW said that her work may be of interest only to continental philosophy as she does not participate in Indic discourse. The Indian Express commented on the negative implications of Gandhi and Philosophy and said that through this book "Gandhi can be seen as a nihilist — someone who even decries sex for reproduction and would like human society to wither away".

Bibliography

Books 

 Gandhi and Philosophy: On Theological Anti-politics, Bloomsbury Academic, 2018.

Edited 

 The Public Sphere: From Outside the West, Bloomsbury Academic, 2015.
 Narratology and Ideology: Negotiating Context, Form, and Theory in Postcolonial Narratives, Ohio State University Press, 2018.
Virality of Evil Philosophy in the Time of a Pandemic, Rowman & Littlefield , 2022.

Articles 

 "A Flight Indestinate", in Coronavirus, Psychoanalysis, and Philosophy, Editors Fernando Castrillón et al., Oxford: Routledge, 2021.

 "Jean-Luc Nancy: in whose wild heart immortality sleeps homeless", Philosophy World Democracy.

 "May 1968 in the Memories of Imagination", Interventions: International Journal of Postcolonial Studies, Vol 22, 2020.

 "The Hindu Hoax  How upper castes invented a Hindu majority" Caravan Magazine cover story (with S. Mohan and R. Janardhanan)

 "Nous ne saurons jamais pourquoi et pour quoi le monde existe et tourne" in France Culture.

 "Ce que l'hindouisme recouvre", (with S, Mohan), Espirit, June 2020.

 "A Mystery of Mysteries!–" European Journal of Psychoanalysis, 2021.

 "On Freud’s Group Psychology. A Debate (J.-L. Nancy, D. Dwivedi, S. Benvenuto)", European Journal of Psychoanalysis, 2021.

 "The transitivity of the We in Narrative and Political Discourse", Style, Vol 54, No. 1, 2020.

 "Nancy's Wager", Philosophy World Democracy, 2021.

 “Homologies in Freud and Derrida: Civilization and the Death Drive”, Eco-Ethica, Vol 9, 2020.

 "The Endogenous Ends of Education: For Aaron Swartz", (with S, Mohan) European Journal of Psychoanalysis, 2021.

 "Modal of Lost Responsibilities", in Virality of Evil Philosophy in the Time of a Pandemic, Rowman & Littlefield , 2022.

Interviews 

 #ELLEVoices: Divya Dwivedi On How She Is #ImaginingTheWorldToBe, Elle Magazine.
 A French-style revolution alone can help India recover from its current caste stasis, says Prof Dwivedi

 Divya Dwivedi : « En Inde, les minorités religieuses sont persécutées pour cacher que la véritable majorité, ce sont les castes inférieures », Le Monde

 Une nuit de philosophie (1/4) : Philosopher en Inde Interview with Les Chemins de la philosophie at the UNESCOHeadquarters Paris, available as Podcast.

 "The proletariat are all those who are denied the collective faculty of imagination", ILNA

 Interview with Divya Dwivedi, Unesco

See also 

 Women in philosophy
 List of women philosophers
 Nihilism
 Gandhism
 Hannah Arendt
 Simone Weil
 Narratology
 Eschatology

References

Further reading 
 Jean-Luc Nancy, "La religieuse manipulation du pouvoir", in Libération
 R. Bernasconi, "Welcoming Divya Dwivedi and Shaj Mohan’s Gandhi and Philosophy", episteme, issue 4: philosophy for another time; towards a collective political imagination.
 Rex Butler, "An Other Beginning: A New Thinking of the End", Philosophy World Democracy. 
R. Janardhanan, "The Deconstructive Materialism of Dwivedi and Mohan:A New Philosophy of Freedom", Positions Politics, 2021. 
D. J. Smith "Gandhi and Philosophy:Hypophysics and the Comparison between Caste and Race", episteme, issue 4.
Marguerite La Caze, "Cocktails more lethal than Molotovs:Freedom, Indestinacy, and Responsibility in Gandhi and Philosophy", episteme, issue 4.
 R. Janardhanan, " Deconstructive Materialism: Einsteinian Revolution in Philosophy", ‘’Philosophy World Democracy’’

External links 
Divya Dwivedi Author page at Bloomsbury Publishing
episteme issue 4: philosophy for another time; towards a collective political imagination Special issue on the philosophical work of Divya Dwivedi and Shaj Mohan

Deconstruction
Narratology
Heidegger scholars
Ontologists
Philosophers of nihilism
Living people
Indian women philosophers
Lady Shri Ram College alumni
Academic staff of IIT Delhi
St. Stephen's College, Delhi alumni
IIT Delhi alumni
Year of birth missing (living people)
21st-century Indian philosophers